The 1980-81 season was the 108th season of competitive football in Scotland and the 84th season of Scottish league football.

Scottish Premier Division

Champions: Celtic
Relegated: Kilmarnock, Hearts

Scottish League Division One

Promoted: Hibernian, Dundee
Relegated: Stirling Albion, Berwick Rangers

Scottish League Division Two

Promoted: Queen's Park, Queen of the South

Cup honours

Other honours

National

County

 – aggregate over two legs – replay – won on penalties

Highland League

Individual honours

Scottish national team

Key:
(H) = Home match
(A) = Away match
WCQG6 = World Cup qualifying – Group 6
BHC = British Home Championship

See also
 1980–81 Aberdeen F.C. season
 1980–81 Hibernian F.C. season
 1980–81 Rangers F.C. season

Notes and references

External links
Scottish Football Historical Archive

 
Seasons in Scottish football